Dolgelley or Dolgellau power station was a combined diesel and hydroelectric generating station. It provided electricity to the town of Dolgellau, Gwynedd, Wales and the surrounding district from 1936 until the 1960s.

History 
Dolgellau Urban District Council constructed a combined diesel engine and water-turbine electricity generating plant at Frongoch Dolgellau. In 1936–7 the Electricity Commissioners had authorised the Council to obtain a loan of £4,979 for building work, the purchase of plant, the installation of mains, and the provision of customers’ meters. Upon the nationalisation of the British electricity supply industry in 1948 the Dolgellau power station was vested in the British Electricity Authority. The power station was decommissioned in the 1960s.

Power station owners 
The owners and operators of the power station over its operational life were: Dolgellau Urban District Council (1935–48), British Electricity Authority](1948–55), Central Electricity Authority (1955–57), Central Electricity Generating Board (1958–70).

Plant and equipment 
The plant at Dolgellau power station comprised:

 One 66 kW Brush diesel engine set
 One 29 kW Gilkes-Gordon water turbine set
 One 53 kW Gilkes-Gordon water turbine set

The total generating capacity was 148 kW, the generating sets operated at 400 V alternating current.

Operations 
The operating conditions and electricity output of Dolgellau power station were:

See also 

 Timeline of the UK electricity supply industry
 List of power stations in Wales
 Hydroelectricity in the United Kingdom

References 

Hydroelectric power stations in Wales
Dolgellau